Słomczyn  is a village in the administrative district of Gmina Grójec, within Grójec County, Masovian Voivodeship, in east-central Poland.

The Autodrom Słomczyn is a permanent motorsport circuit located near the town.

External links
 Jewish Community in Słomczyn on Virtual Shtetl

References

Villages in Grójec County